Nico Antonitsch (born 30 September 1991) is an Austrian footballer who plays for German  club SV Elversberg.

Club career

Union St. Florian
Antonitsch's first senior club was Union St. Florian in the Austrian Regionalliga. He made his league debut for the club on 6 August 2010 in a 1-1 away draw with Austria Klagenfurt. He scored his first competitive goal for the club on 2 October 2010 in a 3-2 away victory over SC Weiz. His goal, scored in the 67th minute, made the score 3-2 to Union St. Florian.

Kapfenberger
In July 2012, Antonitsch moved to Kapfenberger SV on a free transfer. He made his competitive debut for the senior team on 14 July 2012 in a 2-1 away victory over SC Bregenz. He was subbed on for Sanel Kuljić in the 80th minute. His league debut came just 13 days later, in a 3-3 draw with SV Horn.

SV Horn
In July 2013, Antonitsch moved to Austrian Football Second League club SV Horn. He made his competitive debut for the club on 13 July 2013 in a 3-1 away victory over FC Hard in the Austrian Cup. He was subbed on for Marcel Toth in the 67th minute. He made his league debut for the club just six days later, in a 3-2 away defeat to SCR Altach. He was subbed on for Bernd Gschweidl at halftime. His first competitive goal for the club came on 25 March 2014 in a 3-1 home defeat to Parndorf. He scored in the 85th minute.

SV Ried
In June 2015, Antonitsch moved to SV Ried in the Austrian Bundesliga on a one-year contract with an option for another year's extension. He made his competitive debut for the club on 29 August 2015 in a 4-1 away defeat to Grödig. He was subbed on for Bernhard Janeczek in the 35th minute. His first competitive goal for the club came on 6 February 2016 in a 3-3 away draw with Mattersburg. His goal, scored in the 59th minute, made the score 3-1 to Ried. In a league match against Austria Wien on 5 March 2016, Antonitsch was subbed off injured in the 63rd minute, to be replaced by Denis Streker. He ended up suffering a ligament tear in his left knee, leaving him sidelined for six weeks.

FC Juniors OÖ
In July 2017, Antonitsch signed for Austrian Regionalliga club FC Juniors OÖ. He made his competitive debut for the club on 22 July 2017 in a 4-3 away victory over TuS Bad Gleichenberg.

FSV Zwickau
In August 2017, Antonitsch signed for 3. Liga club FSV Zwickau. He made his competitive debut for the club on 8 September 2017 in a 2-0 away victory over Preußen Münster. He scored his first competitive goal for the club just a week later, in a 3-1 home victory over Magdeburg. His goal, scored in the 63rd minute, made the score 3-1 to Zwickau. In June 2018, Antonitsch renewed his contract with Zwickau, opting to stay another year. He had been offered contracts with clubs in Cyprus and Austria, but he decided to stay in Germany.

FC Ingolstadt 04
In August 2019, FC Ingolstadt announced the signing of Antonitsch on a deal until 2021.

SV Elversberg
On 5 January 2023, Antonitsch signed a 1.5-year contract with SV Elversberg.

References

External links
Profile at WhoScored

1991 births
Living people
Footballers from Vienna
Austrian footballers
Austrian expatriate footballers
Austrian expatriate sportspeople in Germany
Expatriate footballers in Germany
Association football defenders
Kapfenberger SV players
SV Horn players
SV Ried players
FC Juniors OÖ players
FSV Zwickau players
FC Ingolstadt 04 players
SV Elversberg players
Austrian Football Bundesliga players
2. Liga (Austria) players
3. Liga players